Peter White (born March 15, 1969) is a Canadian former professional ice hockey centre who played nine seasons in the National Hockey League (NHL) for the Edmonton Oilers, Toronto Maple Leafs, Philadelphia Flyers and Chicago Blackhawks.

Playing career
As a youth, White played in the 1982 Quebec International Pee-Wee Hockey Tournament with a minor ice hockey team from the Montreal North Shore.

White was drafted in the fifth round, and 92nd overall, by the Edmonton Oilers in the 1989 NHL Entry Draft. He played 220 career NHL games, scoring 23 goals and 37 assists for 60 points while recording 36 penalty minutes playing for the Edmonton Oilers, Toronto Maple Leafs, Philadelphia Flyers and Chicago Blackhawks.

White spent most of his career in the American Hockey League (AHL), playing in a total of 747 games while scoring 250 goals and 533 assists for 783 points and recording 286 penalty minutes. He led the AHL in total points in 1995, 1997 and 1998.

In September 2005, he signed with HIFK of the Finnish SM-liiga for the 2005–06 season. In 49 games, he scored 4 goals and 10 assists for 14 points while recording 20 penalty minutes. In the post-season that year, he recorded 1 assist and 8 penalty minutes in 11 games.

Personal life

White was once married to Jody Clarke, daughter of Bobby Clarke. At the time, Clarke was the general manager of the Philadelphia Flyers, where White spent eight seasons in both the AHL and NHL in two different stints with the organization.

Awards and honours

Career statistics

References

External links

1969 births
Living people
Atlanta Knights players
Canadian expatriate ice hockey players in Finland
Canadian ice hockey centres
Cape Breton Oilers players
Chicago Blackhawks players
Edmonton Oilers draft picks
Edmonton Oilers players
HIFK (ice hockey) players
Ice hockey people from Montreal
Los Angeles Kings scouts
Michigan State Spartans men's ice hockey players
Norfolk Admirals players
Philadelphia Flyers players
Philadelphia Phantoms players
St. John's Maple Leafs players
Toronto Maple Leafs players
Utah Grizzlies (AHL) players